José Eduardo Verástegui Córdoba (born May 21, 1974) is a Mexican producer and actor. He was part of band Kairo and later a solo music career, before he started appearing in Mexican telenovelas and eventually feature films like Chasing Papi,  Bella, and Little Boy, the latter two produced by his own production company, Metanoia.

Early life
Verástegui was born in Xicoténcatl, Tamaulipas, Mexico. He was raised in a practicing Catholic family.

Career 
After finding success as a musical entertainer, and then as a soap opera star, he decided to pursue a career in Hollywood. In 2002, before filming commenced on Chasing Papi, Verástegui took voice-coaching lessons to improve his English pronunciation. The coach was a committed Catholic, and in the course of their conversations Verástegui re-discovered his faith and resolved to change his lifestyle. He also declared that he had decided to turn down offers to play roles in films that conflicted with his Catholic beliefs or that insulted his Latino brethren. In an interview with Dave Hartline, the author of The Tide Is Turning Toward Catholicism and published by Catholic Report, he said he was committed to attend Mass daily, praying, reading the Bible, saying the rosary and going to Confession at least once a week. He also said that he first encountered his renewed faith in Scott Hahn's book, Rome Sweet Home that "had a great impact on me and its influences can be seen in a lot of what I do".

Other activities 
Verástegui is an anti-abortion advocate, through the organization Manto de Guadalupe. Verástegui recounts an anecdote about his beliefs: he was doing research for his role in Bella and had gone to an abortion clinic as part of that process. While there, he started talking to a Hispanic couple who were going to the clinic for an abortion. He says that, recognizing him from his telenovela roles on Mexican television, they listened as he described his upcoming role and the plotline of Bella. They reconsidered their decision and went home without going ahead with the abortion. Immediately after their child was born, they called him to tell him the good news and thanking him and asking for his permission to name the child Eduardo after him. He also made a point of meeting "little Eduardo" weeks later.

In 2008, he released a long video message denouncing the high rate of abortion in Hispanic communities in the United States and speaking out loudly about alleged targeting of the Hispanic communities with messages supporting abortion by the Barack Obama campaign during the presidential race.

Actively involved in charities, he has established Manto de Guadalupe, an anti-abortion organization based in Los Angeles and offering a crisis pregnancy center.

On September 15, 2020 President Donald Trump announced his intent to nominate and appoint Eduardo Verastegui to be a member of the President's Advisory Commission on Hispanic Prosperity. Verástegui signed the Madrid Charter, a document drafted by the conservative Spanish party Vox that describes left-wing groups as enemies of Ibero-America involved in a "criminal project" that are "under the umbrella of the Cuban regime".

Verástegui is popular on social media, with an active YouTube channel of nearly 300,000 subscribers.

In November 2022, Verástegui organized a Conservative Political Action Conference (CPAC) in Mexico.

Metanoia Films
Verástegui cofounded the production company Metanoia Films (the Greek word for "repentance") with co-founders and partners Sean Wolfington, Alejandro Gomez Monteverde and Leo Severino. The company is based in Beverly Hills, California. The company released its debut film Bella directed by Alejandro Gomez Monteverde and starring Verástegui. The latest project of the company is Little Boy written by Alejandro Monteverde and Pepe Portillo. Starring Emily Watson, Kevin James, David Henrie, Jacob Salvati, Ben Chaplin, and set in 1945, it tells the story of Pepper, an eight-year-old who does all he can to be reunited with his father, a soldier fighting in World War II and captured by the Japanese. Meanwhile, Pepper has to befriend Hashimoto, a Japanese man living in his town.

Discography

Albums
as part of Kairo
(For detailed discographies, see Kairo discography section )
1994: Signo del tiempo
1995: Gaudium
1996: Cara a cara [joint album credited to Kairo & Magneto]
1997: Éxitos

as solo
2001: Eduardo Verástegui

Singles
as part of Kairo
1994: "En los espejos de un café"
1994: "Háblame de ti"
1994: "Te amaré"
1994: "Perdóname'
1995: "No nos rendimos"
1995: "Ponme la multa (Fammi la multa)"
1995: "Dile que la amo"

Music video
2001: Jennifer Lopez's "Ain't It Funny" (Alt. Version) (playing her love interest in the music video)

Filmography

Films

Television

See also
 List of Mexican actors

References

External links

Dos dias con Eduardo Verastegui /Two days with Eduardo Verastegui en/at www.TheresaBernabe.TV 
Eduardo Verástegui's Interview with "Catholic Digest".
Manto de Guadalupe Official Site
Metanoia official website
Bella film official website

1974 births
Living people
People from Tamaulipas
Male actors from Tamaulipas
Mexican Catholics
Mexican male film actors
Mexican male television actors
20th-century Mexican male actors
21st-century Mexican male actors
Mexican anti-abortion activists
Mexican people of Basque descent
Mexican male telenovela actors
Mexican male models
Mexican emigrants to the United States
Vaccine hesitancy
Signers of the Madrid Charter